The canton of Plancoët is an administrative division of the Côtes-d'Armor department, northwestern France. Its borders were modified at the French canton reorganisation which came into effect in March 2015. Its seat is in Plancoët.

It consists of the following communes:
 
Bourseul
Corseul
Créhen
Landébia
La Landec
Languédias
Languenan
Plancoët
Plélan-le-Petit
Pléven
Plorec-sur-Arguenon
Pluduno
Saint-Jacut-de-la-Mer
Saint-Lormel
Saint-Maudez
Saint-Méloir-des-Bois
Saint-Michel-de-Plélan
Trébédan

References

Cantons of Côtes-d'Armor